Patayan is a group of prehistoric and historic Native American cultures in parts of modern-day Arizona, west to Lake Cahuilla in California, and in Baja California, from AD 700 to 1550. This included areas along the Gila River, Colorado River and in the Lower Colorado River Valley, the nearby uplands, and north to the vicinity of the Grand Canyon.

Cultural neighbors
Patayan culture is sometimes known as the Hakataya culture. Their nearest cultural neighbors were the Hohokam in central and eastern Arizona.  The historic Yuman-speaking peoples in this region were skilled warriors and active traders, maintaining exchange networks with the Pima in southern Arizona and with the Californian Pacific Coast tribes.

Archaeology
The name "Patayan" comes from the Quechan language and means "old people". Alternative terms have been proposed for the culture group. The archaeological record of the Patayan is poorly understood.  Archaeologist Malcolm Rogers first identified the Patayan, publishing a definition and chronology in 1945. His survey identified hundreds of desert sites. The harsh environment limits archaeological fieldwork and there are few remains to find. Most Patayan people appear to have been very mobile and did not build large structures or accumulate many possessions. Patayan sites may have raised crops.

Significant archaeological remains of Patayan cultures appear near 875 A.D. and many cultural characteristics continued into historic times. The Patayan Culture may have originally emerged along the Colorado River, extending from the area around modern Kingman northeast to the Grand Canyon. These people appear to have practiced floodplain agriculture, a conclusion based on the discovery of manos and metates used to process corn in these areas. Stone points and other tools for hunting and hide preparation have been found, suggesting an economy based both on agriculture and hunting and gathering. 

Early Patayan sites contain shallow pithouses or surface "long houses", consisting of a series of rooms arranged in a line. These homes had a pitroom at the east end, perhaps for storage or ceremonial activities. Later sites were less well defined and show loose groupings of varying house types.

Culture and art
The Patayan made both baskets and pottery. Ceramics were apparently not adopted until 700 A.D. Patayan pottery is primarily plain ware, visually resembling the "Alma Plain" of the Mogollon. However, these pots were made using the paddle-and-anvil method, and the forms are more reminiscent of Hohokam ware. The use of paddle-and-anvil construction suggests that people from or influenced by the Hohokam first settled in this territory. Lowland Patayan pottery is made of fine, buff-colored riverine clays, while the upland Patayan pottery is more coarse and a deeper brown. Painted ware, sometimes using red slips, appear heavily influenced by the styles and designs of neighboring cultures.

See also
 List of dwellings of Pueblo peoples
 Pre-historic Southwestern cultural divisions

References

External links
 Patayan Map and Pottery

Colorado River tribes
Oasisamerica cultures
Archaeological cultures of North America
History of indigenous peoples of North America
Pre-Columbian cultures
Native American history of California
Native American history of Arizona
History of Baja California
Quechan
Gila River